Li Weihan (2 June 1896 – 11 August 1984) was a Chinese Communist Party politician. After pursuing his studies in France in 1919–20, he returned to China for the Party's founding Congress in Shanghai in 1921. He became a member of the Politburo in 1927 but fell out of favour shortly afterwards in the wake of the unsuccessful Autumn Harvest Uprising in junction of Hunan and Jiangxi provinces. When he sought to bring the uprising to an end, he found himself accused of cowardice. Li was eclipsed until reemerging in the early 1930s as a supporter of Li Lisan, a leading figure in the party at the time, and an opponent of the anti-Mao 28 Bolsheviks faction. 
 
Li Weihan was promoted to become the first principal of the Yan'an-based Central Party School of the Communist Party, the highest training center for party workers and leaders. Li served as principal from 1933 to 1935 and again from 1937 to 1938. After the Proclamation of the People's Republic of China in 1949, Li was involved in managing China's minorities and nationalities as Chairman of the State Ethnic Affairs Commission. He was also a significant player in the Party's drive to introduce state control of the economy (Soviet-type economic planning), and in the late-1950s Anti-Rightist Campaign, in which his own brother was purged.

Li was the director between 1944 and 1964 of the United Front Department, the predecessor to the present-day United Front Work Department. He was removed from his post in 1964 and was subsequently criticised by Zhou Enlai for "capitulationism in united front work". However, he reemerged after 1978 as a supporter of the reformist Deng Xiaoping – who Li had saved from persecution years before – and as a critic of Mao and autocracy in the Party, which Li referred to as "feudalism". Deng promoted Li in 1982 to the post of vice chairman of the Central Advisory Commission, which Deng himself chaired. Li died in office in August 1984.

See also
 Historical Museum of French-Chinese Friendship

References

External links 
Biographical note on Li Weihan

1896 births
1984 deaths
Burials at Babaoshan Revolutionary Cemetery
Chinese Communist Party politicians from Hunan
Delegates to the 4th National Congress of the Chinese Communist Party
Delegates to the 5th National Congress of the Chinese Communist Party
Hunan First Normal University alumni
Members of the Politburo Standing Committee of the Chinese Communist Party
Members of the 4th Central Executive Committee of the Chinese Communist Party
Members of the 5th Central Committee of the Chinese Communist Party
Members of the 8th Central Committee of the Chinese Communist Party
People's Republic of China politicians from Hunan
Politicians from Changsha
Secretaries of the Central Commission for Discipline Inspection
Secretary-General of the Chinese People's Political Consultative Conference\
Vice Chairpersons of the National People's Congress
Vice Chairpersons of the National Committee of the Chinese People's Political Consultative Conference